Rajesh Saraiya (born 1969) is an industrialist and member of DICCI. 

He is considered as first Dalit billionaire of India.

Rajesh Saraiya is the CEO of Steel Mont Trading.Ltd, headquartered at Dusseldorf (Germany). It deals with steel trading, production, commodities and shipping. It has offices in London, Kyiv, Moscow, Istanbul, Dubai, Mumbai and Tianjin.

Rajesh Saraiya hails from Saraiya Sani village, Sitapur (U.P), grew up in Dehradun and studied Aeronautical science from Kyiv Institute of Civil Aviation, Ukraine 

He was given the Pravasi Bharatiya Award in 2012 and the Padma Shri in 2014. 

He is now the world's richest from Dalit community

References

Living people
1969 births
Indian billionaires
Businesspeople from Dehradun
Recipients of the Padma Shri in trade and industry